Memorial Plaza, established in 1932, is in the Downtown West neighborhood of St. Louis. The park contains memorials honoring St. Louis veterans of World War I, World War II, Korea and Vietnam. On the eastern edge of the park is the Court of Honor containing monuments listing St. Louisans who lost their lives in World War II, Korea and Vietnam. It extends from 13th to 18th Street between Market and Chestnut and is surrounded by Union Station, Peabody Opera House, and the Soldier's Memorial Military Museum.

See also
Downtown West, St. Louis

References

External links 
Memorial Plaza website

Parks in St. Louis
Urban public parks
Tourist attractions in St. Louis
1932 establishments in Missouri